ProjectWise is a suite of engineering project collaboration software from Bentley Systems designed for the architecture, engineering, construction, and owners/operator (AECO) industries. It helps project teams design, manage, review, share, and distribute engineering project content all within a single connected data environment (CDE). ProjectWise is a file and vendor agnostic solution capable of managing any type of CAD, BIM, geospatial and project data. All well, direct CAD integration is available for Bentley applications and other vendors and software titles including Autodesk & Microsoft Office.

History 1 
In August 1995, Bentley formalized a relationship with Opti inter-Consult, signed them as a strategic affiliate and took on a partial ownership in the company. Opti Inter-Consult was a small Finland-based company that was founded in 1990. It was the developer of TeamMate, which was a Document Management System exclusively distributed by Bentley. Opti Inter-Consult had a suite of products based on document management and facility management.

The following year, Bentley acquired the remaining shares of Opti Inter-Consult and split the two product lines in half. The facilities management products went to a newly formed joint venture with Primavera named WorkPlace Systems. WorkPlace Systems developed several products including ActiveAsset Manager, ActiveAsset Planner, and ActiveAsset Inquirer.

TeamMate was merged with Bentley development and in 1996 MicroStation TeamMate 96 was released. This version was focused on MicroStation support, but also handled other formats and applications such as Microsoft Office and AutoCAD. TeamMate also had metadata, file history, versions, and Query By Example to locate files.

In 1998, TeamMate was rebranded to the name ‘ProjectWise’. ProjectWise 3.xx was released early 2000 and over the next two years added features that included the Web Explorer Lite, which was the first web client. Document level security, DWG redlining, and the document creation wizard were also added.

ProjectWise V8 started the modern era of ProjectWise. The January 2003 release included such innovations as the Preview Pane, Workspace Profiles, Components, Audit Trail, and the Distribution System. Over the next few years we saw 2004 and V8 XM Edition ProjectWise releases. These releases included Full Text Search, Thumbnails, DGN Indexing, Managed Workspaces, and SharePoint Web Parts.
Late in 2008, the first V8i release of ProjectWise was introduced. It included Delta File Transfer, the Web View Server, Spatial Navigation, the Quick Search tool bar, and auto login to integrated applications. Over the next several years, SELECTseries releases (one through four) have included Revit and Civil3D integration, as well at Transmittals, Dynamic Composition Server, Point Cloud Streaming, and Dynamic Plotting.

Version History

References

Further reading

External links 
 
 ProjectWise Forums at BE Communities by Bentley
 Microsoft Customer Solution Manufacturing Industry Case Study at Microsoft.com
 ENR Top Firms Choose Bentley’s ProjectWise for Project Work Sharing and Substantive Collaboration at Bentley
 Offshore Top 5 Projects 2015 at Offshore Magazine
 Connect Project Teams with AutoCAD and ProjectWise at Cadalyst.com
 ProjectWise Collaboration and Work Sharing Advantages at Benzinga.com
 Bentley’s New ProjectWise Essentials at Reuters.com
 Bentley Conference at ArchitectureWeek.com
 ProjectWiseBlog at ProjectWiseBlog.com

Computer-aided design software
Computer-aided design software for Windows
Content management systems
Project management software
1998 software
Projects established in 1998